Thiago Guimarães Sales (born May 7, 1987 in Rio de Janeiro), or simply Thiago Sales, is a Brazilian central defender. He currently plays for Caxias.

Career
Made professional debut and scored for Flamengo against Sport in 1-1 draw in the Campeonato Brasileiro, September 1, 2007.

Flamengo career statistics
(Correct As of December 5, 2011)

according to combined sources on the Flamengo official website and Flaestatística.

Honours
Flamengo
Taça Guanabara: 2008
Campeonato Brasileiro Série A: 2009
Taça Rio: 2009
Rio de Janeiro State League: 2008, 2009
Fluminense
Campeonato Brasileiro Série A: 2010
Apollon Limassol
Cypriot Cup: 2009–2010
Resende
Copa Rio: 2015

Contract
Flamengo 1 September 2007 to 31 August 2010.

References

External links
 
flamengorj 
CBF 
Thiago Sales substitui Angelim no Maraca 

1987 births
Living people
Brazilian footballers
CR Flamengo footballers
Apollon Limassol FC players
Fluminense FC players
Avaí FC players
Tupi Football Club players
Resende Futebol Clube players
Sociedade Esportiva e Recreativa Caxias do Sul players
Campeonato Brasileiro Série A players
Cypriot First Division players
Association football defenders
Brazilian expatriate footballers
Expatriate footballers in Cyprus
Brazilian expatriate sportspeople in Cyprus
Expatriate footballers in Kuwait
Brazilian expatriate sportspeople in Kuwait
Al Jahra SC players
Kuwait Premier League players
Footballers from Rio de Janeiro (city)